Westfield Montgomery (formerly known as Montgomery Mall) is a shopping mall in Bethesda, Maryland. Major tenants include Macy's, Macy's Home, and Nordstrom, as well as specialty brands like Fabletics, Madewell, Vineyard Vines, and Untuckit.

History

The mall opened in March 1968, with three anchor stores and 58 smaller shops. It was built as a joint venture between The May Department Stores Company and Strouse, Greenberg & Co., based on the design of John Graham, Jr. and Ward and Hall. The original anchors were Hecht's, Garfinckel's, and Sears. Smaller shops included a Bond Stores outlet. The Mall was also where longtime fugitive William Bradford Bishop bought a ball peen hammer and gas can to allegedly kill and burn his entire family on March 1, 1976. The old mall logo was an owl-shaped "M".

The renovation completed in October 1991 included new floors, brass railings, glass elevator, which was removed in 2013, and removal of all the fountains to allow for more kiosk and seating space. The grand re-opening featured a concert by Tony Bennett. An expansion wing featured the first Nordstrom in Maryland and the third in the Washington, D.C. metropolitan area, and Crate & Barrel. The Boulevard Cafes food court is located on the second level.

Expansion

In 2014, a 16-screen Arclight Cinemas opened at the mall but was forced to close down in April 2021 due to the COVID-19 pandemic. In February 2022, AMC Theatres acquired the lease to the cinema and announced that it would reopen in March of that year.

In June 2018, Westfield announced Sears will close and transform into additional stores and an open-air mixed-use center.

2016 shooting 

On May 6, 2016, former federal police officer Eulalio Tordil shot three people in the parking lot. One victim died.

After the 2005 acquisition of May Department Stores by Federated Department Stores, the Hecht’s at Montgomery was renamed Macy’s in 2006.

Anchors

Current anchors
 Macy's
 Macy's Home
 Nordstrom
 AMC Theatres

Former anchors
 Hecht's
 Garfinckel's
 J. C. Penney (took over Woodward & Lothrop store, 1995)
 Sears
 Woodward & Lothrop
 Arclight Cinemas

References

External links 

 
 Westfield Montgomery Leasing Information, at The Westfield Group
 

Montgomery, Westfield
Montgomery
Tourist attractions in Montgomery County, Maryland
Shopping malls established in 1968
1968 establishments in Maryland
Shopping malls in the Washington metropolitan area
Potomac, Maryland
Bethesda, Maryland